Leonard Tyrone Wheeler (born January 15, 1969) is a former American football safety in the National Football League. He was drafted by the Cincinnati Bengals in the third round of the 1992 NFL Draft. He played college football at Ole Miss and Troy State.

Wheeler also played for the Minnesota Vikings and Carolina Panthers.

References

1969 births
Living people
American football safeties
American football cornerbacks
Ole Miss Rebels football players
Northwest Mississippi Rangers football players
Troy Trojans football players
Cincinnati Bengals players
Minnesota Vikings players
Carolina Panthers players